Birkenhead railway station may refer to:

Birkenhead Central railway station, the main station in Birkenhead, Wirral, England
Birkenhead Dock railway station, a former station on the Hoylake Railway
Birkenhead Grange Lane railway station, a former station on the Chester and Birkenhead Railway
Birkenhead Hamilton Square railway station, an underground station on the Wirral Line of the Merseyrail network
Birkenhead Monks Ferry railway station, a former station on the Chester and Birkenhead Railway
Birkenhead North railway station, on the Wirral Line of the Merseyrail network
Birkenhead Park railway station, on the Wirral Line of the Merseyrail network
Birkenhead Town railway station, a former station on the Chester and Birkenhead Railway
Birkenhead Woodside railway station, a former station on the Chester and Birkenhead Railway
Peterhead railway station, Adelaide, serving Birkenhead, South Australia